Pink Cream 69 is a German hard rock/heavy metal band founded in 1987 in Karlsruhe by Andi Deris, Dennis Ward, Kosta Zafiriou and Alfred Koffler. The band gained their first contract by winning music magazine Metal Hammers newcomer competition in Ludwigsburg one year after forming. In 1994, Andi Deris left the band to join German power metal band Helloween. He was replaced by British singer David Readman in August 1994.

The band, often referred to as The Pinkies, became a five-piece in 2003, when Uwe Reitenauer was hired to support neuropathic guitar player Alfred Koffler.

On 5 March 2012 it was announced that drummer Kosta Zafiriou had left the band, due to his various activities as a manager at the company Bottom Row and as the drummer and manager of the new band Unisonic. He was replaced by Chris Schmidt.

In 2019 and 2020, respectively, bassist Dennis Ward and guitarist Uwe Reitenauer announced their departure from the band. They were replaced by Roman Beselt (from the band Sons of Sounds) and Marco Wriedt (from the bands 21 Octayne, Arc of Light, Axxis).

Members

Current members 
Alfred Koffler – guitars, backing vocals (1987–present)
David Readman – lead vocals (1994–present)
Chris Schmidt – drums (2012–present)
Marco Wriedt – guitars, backing vocals (2020–present)
Roman Beselt – bass, backing vocals (2020–present)

Past members 
Dennis Ward – bass, keyboards, backing vocals (1987–2019)
Andi Deris – lead vocals, guitars (1987–1994)
Kosta Zafiriou – drums, backing vocals (1987–2012)
Uwe Reitenauer – guitars, backing vocals (2003–2020)

Timeline

Discography

Studio albums 
 1989: Pink Cream 69
 1991: One Size Fits All
 1993: Games People Play
 1995: Change
 1997: Food for Thought
 1998: Electrified
 2000: Sonic Dynamite
 2001: Endangered
 2004: Thunderdome
 2007: In10sity
 2013: Ceremonial
 2017: Headstrong

Live albums 
 1997: Live
 2009: Live in Karlsruhe

EPs 
 1991: 49°/8°
 1991: 36°/140°
 2000: Mixery

Maxi-Singles 
 1993: Face In The Mirror
 1995: 20th Century Boy

DVD 
 2009: Pink Cream 69 – Past & Present

References

External links 
 
 

1987 establishments in Germany
Epic Records artists
German hard rock musical groups
German heavy metal musical groups
Musical groups established in 1987
Musical quartets
Frontiers Records artists
Massacre Records artists